Abiotrophia balaenopterae is a bacterium from the genus Abiotrophia which has been isolated from a common minke whale.

References

Lactobacillales
Bacteria described in 1999